Stack Is the New Black is the debut studio album by Australian pop punk band Short Stack, released through Sunday Morning Records on 14 August 2009. It peaked at number 1 on the ARIA Charts and was certified gold in Australia in 2011.

Release
The album's track listing was announced on 12 June 2009 through the band's website. The same day the album was also made available for pre-order, with all pre-orders before 17 July receiving a personal phone call from the band, and their name printed in the album's booklet. JB Hi-Fi online also offered a pre-order of a signed album with a free shirt, guitar picks, poster and stickers.

Both songs "The Back of My Head" and "Thick as Thieves" were both written in the band's early years. They were remade for the album, "Thick as Thieves" was previously named "We Breakdance, Not Hearts". It sounded very similar to "Thick as Thieves". Originally, "The Back of My Head" had Andy Clemmensen and Shaun Diviney singing in the chorus and just Andy singing the verses, but this was changed so that Andy sung the verses and Shaun sung the choruses. (Normally, Andy is the backing vocalist and Shaun in the lead vocalist, except on this song.)

Track listing

Charts

Weekly charts

Year-end charts

Certification

See also
 List of number-one albums of 2009 (Australia)

References

2009 albums
Short Stack albums